The Schenck classification is a system of categorizing knee dislocations based on the pattern of multiligamentous injury.  It is limited clinically by not describing the risk of neurovascular involvement.

Classification

References

Knee injuries
Orthopedic classifications